Robert Burnham may refer to:

 Robert Burnham Jr. (1931–1993), American astronomer
 Robert Burnham (priest) (died 1362), canon of Windsor
 Bo Burnham (Robert Pickering Burnham, born 1990), American comedian and singer
 Robert F. Burnham (1913–1969), U.S. Air Force general